Peter Gunn is an album by saxophonist/conductor Ted Nash, led by Nash and arranged and produced by Maxwell Davis that was recorded in 1959 and released on the Crown label. The album is not Henry Mancini's popular score of the TV series Peter Gunn, which featured Nash playing "Dreamsville" on the original soundtrack, but a reinterpretation of the compositions issued to take advantage of the popularity of the series and theme.

Reception

The AllMusic review by Stephan Cook noted it: "features some of the best Los Angeles session players of the time ... with brass-heavy, crime jazz tunes like "Fallout!" ... The bulk of the material, though, is in a cool, West Coast jazz vein ... Also included are the kind of sleepy-eyed lounge cuts Mancini excelled at, like "Dreamsville," "A Quiet Gass," and "Soft Sounds." This is an excellent collection and one that ranks with Mancini's other fine film and TV work from the '50s and '60s".

Track listing 
All compositions by Henry Mancini
 "Peter Gunn" – 2:03	
 "Sorta Blue" – 2:54
 "The Brothers Go to Mothers" – 2:42
 "Dreamsville"	– 3:38
 "Soft Sounds"	– 3:34
 "Fallout !" – 3:10
 "The Floater" – 3:15	
 "Session at Pete's Pad" – 3:47	
 "A Profound Gass" – 3:08
 "Brief and Breezy" – 3:27

Personnel 
Ted Nash - alto saxophone, flute, conductor
Pete Candoli - trumpet (tracks 1, 2, 4, 5 & 8) 
Dick Nash – trombone (tracks 1-5 & 8)
Ronnie Lang – baritone saxophone (tracks 1, 2, 4, 5 & 8)
John T. Williams (tracks 1-5 & 8), Russ Freeman (tracks 6, 7, 9 & 10) – piano
Larry Bunker – vibraphone
Tony Rizzi – guitar  (tracks 6, 7, 9 & 10)
Cliff Hils  (tracks 6, 7, 9 & 10), Rolly Bundock (tracks 1-5 & 8) - bass 
Alvin Stoller - drums
Joe Triscari, Larry Sullivan, Uan Rasey - trumpet (tracks 1, 4, 5 & 8) 
David Wells, Jimmy Priddy, Karl de Karske – trombone (tracks 1, 4, 5 & 8)
Art Maebe Jr., George Hyde, Jim Decker, Bill Hinshaw – French horn (tracks 1, 4, 5 & 8)
Maxwell Davis – arranger

References 

Ted Nash (saxophonist, born 1922) albums
1959 albums
Crown Records albums
Albums recorded at Radio Recorders